Vulović is a Serbian surname. Notable people with the surname include:

Aleksa Vulović, Australian comedian and YouTube personality
Ljubomir Vulović (1876–1917), artillery major in the Serbian Army
Vesna Vulović (1950–2016), Serbian flight attendant

See also
Vuković

Serbian surnames